Kehinde Okenla (born 16 November 1972) is a Nigerian table tennis player. She competed in the women's doubles event at the 2000 Summer Olympics.

References

1972 births
Living people
Nigerian female table tennis players
Olympic table tennis players of Nigeria
Table tennis players at the 2000 Summer Olympics
Place of birth missing (living people)